There's Only One Jimmy Grimble, also known as Jimmy Grimble, is a 2000 British sports drama film directed by John Hay, starring Robert Carlyle, Ray Winstone, Lewis McKenzie, Gina McKee, Ben Miller and Samia Ghadie. Set in Greater Manchester Jimmy is a young aspiring footballer who plays for his school team who after receiving a pair of old football boots who once belonged to one of Manchester City's greatest ever player, he begins to see his skills on the field change.

Plot
The film is set around Oldham, Greater Manchester, Jimmy Grimble (Lewis McKenzie) is a 15-year-old misfit living in Manchester, where nothing seems to go his way. Jimmy is constantly threatened by the school bully, "Gorgeous" Gordon (Bobby Power); he is also not sure what to make of Johnny (Ben Miller), a lost-in-the-ozone biker who is dating Donna (Gina McKee), Jimmy's mum; and he has a crush on one of his classmates, Sara (Samia Ghadie), who seems to like him, but his powers of speech  fail him when he tries to talk to her. Like most Mancunians, Jimmy loves football. He is a fervent supporter of Manchester City and attends home games with Donna's ex-boyfriend, Harry (Ray Winstone). Jimmy also loves to play football, but while Eric (Robert Carlyle), the coach of his school's team, thinks he has potential, "Gorgeous" is already a skilled player, and when Gordon's father informs the school he will make a large and much-needed donation if their team makes it to the Manchester Schools Cup final, it looks like Jimmy will be on the bench for a while. But when an old woman gives Jimmy a pair of boots that once belonged to one of City's greatest players, his skills on the field begin to change.

Cast

Reviews
The movie gained an indifferent reception from critics.

See also
 Billy's Boots

References

External links
 
 
 Review at BBC Films
 Tom Fogg, There's Only One Jimmy Grimble, at FilmFestivals.com
 Jimmy Grimble, Le Stuff Journal
 Jim White, There's Only One Jimmy Grimble, from Sight & Sound, September 2000

2000 films
2000s sports comedy films
British association football films
British sports comedy films
Films set in the Metropolitan Borough of Oldham
Manchester City F.C.
Films shot in Greater Manchester
Films shot in Lancashire
Adultery in films
2000 comedy films
2000s English-language films
2000s British films